John Wolters (born September 9, 1940) is an American sprint canoeist who competed in the early 1960s. He was eliminated in the semifinal round of the K-2 1000 m event at the 1960 Summer Olympics in Rome.

References
Sports-reference.com profile

External links

1940 births
American male canoeists
Canoeists at the 1960 Summer Olympics
Living people
Olympic canoeists of the United States
Place of birth missing (living people)